The 1986–87 Eintracht Frankfurt season was the 87th season in the club's football history. In 1986–87 the club played in the Bundesliga, the top tier of German football. It was the club's 24th season in the Bundesliga.

Matches

Legend

Friendlies

Bundesliga

League fixtures and results

League table

Results summary

Results by round

DFB-Pokal

Indoor soccer tournaments

Frankfurt Cup

Group stage

Play-offs

Stuttgart Cup

Group stage

Play-offs

Strasbourg Cup

Group stage

Final round

Squad

Squad and statistics

|}

Transfers

In:

Out:

Sources

External links
 Official English Eintracht website 
 German archive site 

1986-87
German football clubs 1986–87 season